Kabir Bakul is a Bangladeshi lyricist and journalist. He won the Bangladesh National Film Award for Best Lyrics 6 times for the films Megher Kole Rod (2008), Swami Strir Wada (2009), Nisshash Amar Tumi (2010), Purno Doirgho Prem Kahini (2013), Nayok (2018) and Bishwoshundori (2020). As of 2013, he wrote about 5000 songs.

Early life and career 
Bakul was born and grew up in Chandpur. He learnt singing from Shital Kumar Ghoshal. In 1987, he first came to Dhaka and gave thirteen lyrics to singer Tapan Chowdhury. Bakul's first song, Kaal Shara Raat, was featured in Ayub Bachchu’s album, Moyna. The second was sung by Nasim Ali Khan from Souls band. At that time, he was a masters student at the University of Dhaka. He then started working with Monowar Hossen Tutul.

Bakul became a reporter for the Daily Bhorer Kagoj. He has been serving as the head of Prothom Alo's Ananda page since 2004.

Bakul started writing songs professionally in 1991. In 1994, he wrote his first song for a feature film, Agni Shantan.

Bakul hosted a musical television program titled "Sur Shambhar," aired on Bangladesh Television.

Works

Songs
 Keno Ei Nishongota
 Bestota Amake Dei Na
 Chandrima Ratri Te
 Akash Chuyeche Matike
 Deewana Deewana
 Akta Chad Chara Rat
 Prithibir Moto Hridoy Thake
 Jodi Bhul Kore
 Priyar Moner Kotha
 Eto Valobesho Na Amay
 Lajuk Patar Moto
 Preme Poreche Mon

Filmography

Awards 
 Bangladesh National Film Award for Best Lyrics (2008, 2009, 2010, 2013, 2018, 2020)
 Citycell-Channel i Music Award
 Producers' Association Award

Personal life
Bakul is married to musician Dinat Jahan Munni since 1997. Together they have two daughters, Prerona and Protikkha, and a son, Prochchhod.

References

External links
 

Living people
People from Chandpur District
University of Dhaka alumni
20th-century Bangladeshi male singers
20th-century Bangladeshi singers
Bangladeshi lyricists
Best Lyricist National Film Award (Bangladesh) winners
Year of birth missing (living people)
21st-century Bangladeshi male singers
21st-century Bangladeshi singers